Milena Müllerová (9 June 1923, in Babice – 15 December 2009, in Prague) was a Czech gymnast who competed in the 1948 Summer Olympics and received a gold medal in the team competition.

References

1923 births
2009 deaths
People from Prague-East District
Czech female artistic gymnasts
Olympic gymnasts of Czechoslovakia
Gymnasts at the 1948 Summer Olympics
Olympic gold medalists for Czechoslovakia
Olympic medalists in gymnastics
Medalists at the 1948 Summer Olympics
Sportspeople from the Central Bohemian Region